Maly Kaltay is a rural locality (a selo) in Cheryomushkinskoye Selsoviet, Zalesovsky District, Altai Krai, Russia. The population was 121 as of 2013. There are 2 streets.

Geography 
Maly Kaltay is located 42 km west of Zalesovo (the district's administrative centre) by road. Cheryomushkino is the nearest rural locality.

References 

Rural localities in Zalesovsky District